Kozma Gamburov  (died 1810), was a Russian stage actor and opera singer (bas).  He was engaged at the Karl Knipper Theatre in St. Petersburg from 1777, where he belonged to the pioneer generation of actors on the first and newly founded public theatre in St Petersburg, and was among his leading members. He performed male principal parts and was known for his roles as heroes and lovers.

References

1810 deaths
19th-century male actors from the Russian Empire
Russian male stage actors
18th-century male actors from the Russian Empire
18th-century opera singers from the Russian Empire
19th-century opera singers from the Russian Empire